The Circus Princess  is a  2008 Russian telenovela. Adaptation of the Venezuelan soap opera La muchacha del circo (1988) based on Delia Fiallo's novel.

Plot
1989, Samarsk. A local cardiac surgeon Pavel Fedotov dies from a first marriage, Marina, during childbirth. Pavel's  the current wife  Victoria  decided to get rid of Marina’s newborn daughter, who, in the event of Paul’s death, would become his full heir. Victoria asks her chauffeur Gennady to give the child to circus artist Raisa. Raisa takes the child and leaves with a circus.

Our days. A circus troupe comes to the provincial town on tour. Two twin brothers, Yaroslav and Svyatoslav, take care of the young beautiful gymnast Asya. Yaroslav falls in love with her at first sight, and the girl reciprocates. No wonder, the intelligent and romantic Yarik is the man of her dreams! But suddenly he is forced to go on business to England.

Eighteen years ago, Asya was born in this town. She is the granddaughter of their stepfather, the famous cardiologist Pavel Fedotov. Mother Asi died in childbirth, and Fedotov believed that the same fate befell the child. In fact, through the efforts of his second wife, Viktoria, the newborn girl was given to circus artist Raisa, who raised her.

Cast
   as Asya Sokolovskaya
 Prokhor Dubravin as Yaroslav and Svyatoslav Romanov
 Maksim Radugin as Ivan Ryabinov, Asya's fiancé
 Anna Kamenkova as Viktoria
 Katerina Shpitsa as Masha
 Alina Sandratskaya as Dina
 Tatyana Lyutaeva as Sofya 
 Vladimir Andreyev as Pavel Fedotov
 Aleksei Zharkov as Alexey Romanov
 Elena Golyanova as Raisa
 Ivan Shabaltas as Malkovtsev, lawyer

References

External links 
 
 Из жизни сериалов. Принцесса цирка

2008 Russian television series debuts
2008 Russian television series endings
Russian drama television series
Russian telenovelas